Samuel Charles Brees ( 1810 – 5 May 1865) was a New Zealand artist, surveyor and engineer. He was born c.1810. He was employed by the New Zealand Company and succeeded in his role William Mein Smith. Brees died at sea on the La Hogue off Blackwall, London.

References

1810 births
1865 deaths
New Zealand engineers
New Zealand surveyors
19th-century New Zealand engineers
19th-century New Zealand artists